The N-123 is a short highway in northern Spain which connects Benabarre to Barbastro. 

The road starts in Benabarre with a junction with the N-230. It heads west past the Embalse de Barasona north of the Sierra de Carrodilla. It then follows the Rio Cinca south before meeting the N-240 at Barbastro.

N-123